Khorramabad (also Romanized as Khorramābād; also known as Khoramābād-e Ommīdkānī, Khorzmābād, and Sakānī) is a village in Howmeh Rural District, in the Central District of Bijar County, Kurdistan Province, Iran. At the 2006 census, its population was 176, in 40 families. The village is populated by Kurds.

References 

Towns and villages in Bijar County
Kurdish settlements in Kurdistan Province